"Silver Moon" is a song by the English singer-songwriter David Sylvian. It is the second single from his album Gone to Earth and was accompanied on release by a video directed by Nicholas Brandt (who would go on to become an esteemed wildlife photographer)..

Chart positions

References

External links

1986 songs
1986 singles
David Sylvian songs
Songs written by David Sylvian
Music videos directed by Nick Brandt